Illusions is the debut studio album of Sadus originally released in 1988. It was re-issued on CD by Roadrunner Records as Chemical Exposure in 1991, and again in 2006 with two bonus tracks.

Reissued by Displeased Records in 2007 with eight bonus tracks and a videoclip.

Track listing

2006 Reissue bonus tracks
 "Desolator" (Demo) - 3:50
Torture (Demo) - 2:43

2007 Reissue bonus tracks
 "Sadus Attack (demo)"
 "Torture (demo)"
 "Kill Team (demo)"
 "Desolator (demo)"
 "Fight or Die (demo)"
 "Twisted Face (demo)"
 "Number One (demo)"
 "Hands of Fate (demo)"
 "Certain Death (video clip)"

Credits
Darren Travis – guitar, vocals
Rob Moore – guitar
Steve Di Giorgio – bass
Jon Allen – drums

Charts

Monthly

References

1988 debut albums
Sadus albums
Roadrunner Records albums

Album artwork by Rickey-Lee Rogers